Pittosporum terminalioides, the cream cheesewood, is a species of plant in the Pittosporaceae family. It is endemic to Hawaii.  It is threatened by habitat loss.

References

Endemic flora of Hawaii
terminalioides
Vulnerable plants
Taxonomy articles created by Polbot